Dave Pine is an American politician and attorney serving as a member of the San Mateo County Board of Supervisors for District 1, which includes the eastern two-thirds of South San Francisco and all of San Bruno, Millbrae, Burlingame, and Hillsborough.

Early life and education
Dave Pine was born in Massachusetts and grew up in New Hampshire, where his father worked as a professor and his mother was a teacher. He has two siblings.

While a freshman at Dartmouth College, Pine ran for and won a seat in the New Hampshire House of Representatives and at age 19, was one of the youngest ever elected. Pine served in the house from 1977 to 1979. After Dartmouth, Pine attended the University of Michigan Law School. He was a summer intern at Fenwick & West in Palo Alto (now located in Mountain View). After graduating in 1985, Pine accepted a position at a corporate law firm, representing Silicon Valley start-up tech companies.

Career

Silicon Valley 
Pine left Fenwick & West in 1990 to join a tech start-up called Radius, Inc, which offered the first large screen available for personal computers and pioneered the concept of dragging windows between multiple screens, a feature first available on the Macintosh Plus. The company grew from 3 to 300 employees in just a few years, and steadily expanded its product line to include processor and graphics accelerator cards, video production software, and Macintosh computer clones.

In 1996 Pine joined the tech start-up @Home Network, which pioneered high-speed cable internet service and quickly grew to serve millions of subscribers. As the company's lawyer, he managed the company's $6.7 billion acquisition of search engine and internet portal Excite in 1999, and the company became Excite@Home, now able to offer both high-speed internet access as well as internet services including search, email, and user homepages. However, Excite@Home declared Chapter 11 bankruptcy in 2001 and its 1,350 employees were laid off.

Politics

Redwood City
From the beginning of his corporate law career, Pine was interested in running for office. From 1993 to 1999, he served on the Redwood City Planning Commission, which reviewed a wide variety of development proposals, including those relating to Redwood Shores, the Pacific Shores Office Park, and the Kaiser Permanente Redwood City Medical Center. During this time, Pine also served on the Redwood City Historic Resource Advisory Committee.

2002 California State Assembly election
In 2002, Pine sought elected office for the first time since serving in the New Hampshire House of Representatives over 20 years before, running to represent California's 19th State Assembly district. Two of his opponents in the Democratic primary had much more extensive political connections. Gina Papan was a California State Deputy Attorney General and the daughter of then-19th Assembly District representative Lou Papan, who had been an Assembly member for 20 years but was being forced out in 2002 due to term limits. Gene Mullin had served on the South San Francisco Planning and Historical Preservation commissions, and was at the time Mayor of South San Francisco.

Pine, who was relatively unknown to voters at the time, made waves by pouring more than $762,000 of his own money into his campaign.

Pine stated that his top priorities were improving the quality of public education with increased funding and by promoting preschool programs, providing affordable housing, providing an efficient public transportation system to reduce traffic congestion, and managing the state's budget using a similar process to that used by private companies.

To provide affordable housing, Pine proposed the construction of multi-story mixed-use housing near along the BART and Caltrain rail corridors in the form of apartments, townhouses, and condominiums, stating that "this type of housing can create a marketplace community and be more vibrant and even more attractive [than single-family detached homes]."

Pine opposed filling the San Francisco Bay to extend the San Francisco International Airport's runways, an idea proposed by airport planners to accommodate a greater number of arrivals and departures during low-visibility conditions. The plan was also opposed by Save The Bay, an environmental group founded in 1961 to stop the filling of the two-thirds of the bay that remained unfilled. In 2008 the San Francisco Board of Supervisors passed a resolution prohibiting additional bay fill to extend the runways.

Pine called for campaign finance reforms including public campaign financing and for campaign donations under $1000 to be tax-deductible. His campaign was mostly self-financed. Pine criticized opponent Gina Papan for accepting a $365,000 campaign contribution from her father Lou Papan, which included $17,500 from tobacco companies, $1,500 from accounting firm Arthur Andersen, and $750 from former energy giant Enron.

Despite outspending each of his opponents, Pine finished a distant 3rd place with just 19% of the vote. This comes out to roughly $98 spent per vote received. South San Francisco Mayor Gene Mullin ended up winning the Democratic nomination, and went on to win the election with 63% of the vote in the heavily Democratic district.

School boards
After Handspring was re-acquired by Palm, Inc in 2003, Pine had amassed sufficient wealth to leave the corporate law industry and make another run for political office. He ran unopposed for a seat on the Burlingame School District Board of Trustees and served until 2006, when he was Board President. In 2007, Pine was elected to the San Mateo Union High School District Board of Trustees. The district, which was in 2008 facing a financial crisis, hired new Superintendent Scott Laurence, previous coach, teacher, Dean of Students, and Principal at Gunn High School in Palo Alto, and Superintendent of Palo Alto Unified School District. The San Mateo Union High School District has since had its bond rating upgraded and has increased its financial reserves. In an effort to promote renewable energy as well as reduce its electricity bills, the Board of Trustees approved a $32 million project to install solar panels on the roofs of six district high schools on November 12, 2009.

2011 San Mateo County Board of Supervisors
Pine won the May 3, 2011 all-mail-ballot special election for the District 1 seat on the San Mateo County Board of Supervisors. Before the election date had even been set, Pine and opponents Richard Holober, Terry Nagel, and Gina Papan had already declared their candidacy. Demetrios Nikas and Michael Stogner later entered the race. Final election results were certified by the San Mateo County Elections Office on May 9, 2011. Out of a total of 88,903 votes cast, Pine received 23,856 (26.8%), Holober 22,299 (25.1), Papan 21,796 (24.5%), Nagel 8,683 (9.8%), Stogner 6,269 (7.1%), and Nikas 2,870 (3.2%).

References

External links
Official Election Site of San Mateo County Contains information on the May 3, 2011 all-mail special election
Dave Pine for San Mateo County Supervisor Dave Pine's official campaign website
Dave Pine for Supervisor Dave Pine's Facebook page

1958 births
Living people
Businesspeople from California
California Democrats
San Mateo County Supervisors
Dartmouth College alumni
Members of the New Hampshire House of Representatives
New Hampshire Democrats
People from Burlingame, California
University of Michigan Law School alumni